Atul Chandrakant Bedade  (born 24 September 1966) is a former Indian cricketer. He played domestic cricket for Baroda and represented India in 13 One Day Internationals, making his debut versus UAE at Sharjah in 1994.

He was credited to be a big hitter of the cricket ball and an attacking batsman. In the early 90s there was a call in Indian cricketing circles for a batsman who could hit hard and therefore Bedade got his chance. However the pressure to hit sixes on him was too much and although he did show his ability in the same series against Pakistan in Sharjah (India lost that match), his hitting was few and far between in the other chances given to him and therefore he was soon dropped and never given a chance again.

Later career
Bedade has continued to remain involved with cricket in different capacities. In 2006, he was the only ex-India player among the thirty five former first-class cricketers who took the umpires' examination which was being promoted by the Board of Control for Cricket in India (BCCI) for former cricketers. Seven years later, in 2013, Bedade scripted another 'first' by becoming the only ex-India player to pass the BCCI's Curators' Certification Course, and that too with flying colours. Bedade also holds a double coaching certificate from the BCCI - National Cricket Academy.

Politics
In September 2010, Bedade contested the Vadodara Municipal Corporation election on a Bharatiya Janata Party (BJP) ticket from ward number 20. Bedade has been actively involved with the BJP, and was also a key member of the Krida Bharti, the sports wing of the Rashtriya Swayamsewak Sangh (RSS).

References

External links
 

Baroda cricketers
Indian cricketers
India One Day International cricketers
West Zone cricketers
1966 births
Living people
Cricketers from Mumbai